Dino Zamparelli (born 5 October 1992) is a British racing driver, born to English parents and with Italian ancestry. His father Mike was a F1 Powerboat World Championship racer.

Career

Early career
Zamparelli began karting at the age of seven, and spent seven years in the various classes around the United Kingdom and Europe.

In 2007 he debuted in Ginetta Junior Championship with Muzz Racing, finishing in thirteenth position. He stayed in series for the next year, and amassed ten wins and another five podiums on his way to the championship title.

Formula Renault and Formula Three
Zamparelli's next step was Formula Renault BARC in 2009, where he finished in third place, scoring three wins. In 2010, due to a lack of funding, he competed only in two races of the BARC championship and two races of the Italian Formula Three Championship with Corbetta Competizioni. Zamparelli returned full-time to Formula Renault BARC in 2011, winning four races and the championship title. He was also a finalist in the 2011 McLaren Autosport BRDC Award.

FIA Formula Two Championship
In 2012, Zamparelli graduated to the FIA Formula Two Championship. Zamparelli was involved in an extraordinary incident during the race meet at Spa. In heavy rain and under safety car conditions, Zamparelli was driving along the Kemmel Straight when a car in front spun. Unable to see the spinning car, he was forced to take evasive action at the very last second. The video of the incident quickly went viral and was viewed over 600,000 times within the first two weeks after being uploaded to YouTube.

GP3 Series
Following the decision to discontinue the running of the Formula Two Championship following the 2012 season, Zamparelli signed for the Marussia Manor Racing F1 Team Young Driver Programme and entered into the 2013 GP3 Series season. He finished the season in 18th place after an indifferent debut year. Zamparelli finished in the points in half of the season's 16 races but was excluded from race 2 in Italy after causing an accident in race 1 of the same event that had a significant impact on the championship standings.

Prior to the 2014 season Zamparelli joined ART Grand Prix. ART will be attempting to continue their record of winning every GP3 series Team Championship since its inception in 2010.

Porsche Carrera Cup Great Britain
In January 2015 Zamparelli announced that he was switching from single seaters to sports cars, joining Parr Motorsport to race in the 2015 Porsche Carrera Cup Great Britain.

British GT Championship

Zamparelli entered the 2019 championship at Snetterton with Chris Car in a Porsche Cayman GT4. The car was uncompetitive in every round and failed to score any points.

Racing record

Career summary

† As Zamparelli was a guest driver, he was ineligible to score points.

Complete FIA Formula Two Championship results
(key)

Complete GP3 Series results
(key) (Races in italics indicate fastest lap)

Complete Britcar results 
(key) (Races in bold indicate pole position in class – 1 point awarded just in first race) (Races in italics indicate fastest lap in class – 1 point awarded all races)

Complete British GT Championship results
(key) (Races in bold indicate pole position) (Races in italics indicate fastest lap)

References

External links

1992 births
Living people
Sportspeople from Bristol
Italian Formula Three Championship drivers
Formula Renault BARC drivers
English people of Italian descent
FIA Formula Two Championship drivers
GP3 Series drivers
German Formula Three Championship drivers
Italian British racing drivers
Porsche Carrera Cup GB drivers
Britcar drivers
English racing drivers
British GT Championship drivers
Ginetta Junior Championship drivers
Manor Motorsport drivers
ART Grand Prix drivers
Porsche Supercup drivers
International GT Open drivers
Fortec Motorsport drivers
Walter Lechner Racing drivers